"Prisoner of Love" is Hikaru Utada's 21st Japanese single and 30th single overall, and was released on May 21, 2008. This was her first Japanese recut single in nine years, after the first one "First Love" in 1999. It is also her first single to be released only in CD+DVD format. "Prisoner of Love" (Quiet Version) serves as the insert song for the Japanese television drama, Last Friends, while the original version is used in the opening theme. It won the Best Theme Song Award in the 57th Drama Academy Awards. "Prisoner of Love" was the 3rd most downloaded song in Japan during 2008.

The song was performed during Utada's two date concert series Wild Life in December 2010.

Music video
The video for "Prisoner of Love", directed by Takeishi Wataru, features Utada writing, arranging, and composing the song. She is seen doing push-ups and punching the air, while the scene switches back to her crafting the song and having writer's block.

The video is very interesting in that it is her first to use various references to her U3 blog. She is seen peeling and eating an orange-like fruit called a mikan, and in her blog she mentioned having a surplus of them. She is also seen drawing her inventive superhero, Super-Kuman, based on Kuma Chang, her stuffed bear, which is the subject for her song "Boku wa Kuma".

Track listing

CD+DVD Version

Digital sales information
On May 13, Barks.jp reported "Prisoner of Love" had sold over 1.5 million downloads across all formats, and on July 7, Yahoo!Japan reported it had sold over 2.9 million downloads, it has been certified by the RIAJ on September 2 for reaching the 1 million mark for Chaku-Uta Full downloads in Japan.

Chart rankings

Weekly charts

Year-end charts

Certifications and sales

References

2008 singles
Hikaru Utada songs
Songs written by Hikaru Utada
Japanese television drama theme songs
Pop ballads
2008 songs